Texas Air Corporation, also known as Texas Air, was an airline holding company, incorporated in June 1980 by airline investor Frank Lorenzo to hold and invest in airlines. The company had its headquarters in the America Tower in the American General Center in Neartown Houston, Texas.

History
The company initially acted as a holding company for Texas International Airlines, which Lorenzo owned through his investment firm Jet Capital. Shortly after its formation, Texas Air founded New York Air, a low-cost carrier in the US Northeast. In 1981, Texas Air acquired Continental Airlines through a hostile takeover bid, and subsequently merged Continental with Texas International, retaining the Continental brand. In 1986, Texas Air acquired both Eastern Air Lines and People Express Airlines, including the assets of People Express's bankrupt subsidiary, Frontier Airlines. In 1987, Texas Air consolidated its airline holdings by merging Frontier, New York Air and People Express into Continental, in turn making the latter the third-largest airline in the US, and leaving Texas Air with two mainline carriers: Continental and Eastern, as well a number of commuter airlines.

Texas Air was famous for its tough stance against organised labor groups, and usage of union-busting tactics to lower labor costs within its subsidiaries. In September 1983, Texas Air pushed Continental into bankruptcy, despite it being a solvent and financially stable company, stating that its high labor costs prevented it from effectively competing with non-union startup carriers. The bankruptcy filing allowed Texas Air to fire 8,000 Continental employees, and subsequently rehire a small portion of them on non-union contracts at lower wage rates. With lower labor costs, Texas Air successfully restructured Continental as a low-fare carrier, and allowed it to exit bankruptcy in 1986. In the same year, the company began a four-year battle with the International Association of Machinists in an attempt to lower labor costs at Eastern. In March 1989, Texas Air locked out Eastern's mechanics, which resulted in the majority of Eastern employees walking out on strike, forcing the airline into bankruptcy. In April 1990, Eastern's bankruptcy judge ordered the removal of Texas Air's control of the carrier, citing deliberate mismanagement and unsafe business tactics.

At its peak in 1986, Texas Air was the second-largest airline in the world, behind the USSR's state carrier Aeroflot, and the largest airline in the United States, with control of 20% of the US domestic air travel market, a fleet of 600 aircraft, and an $8.5 billion valuation. However, by 1989, the company had $5.4 billion worth of debt, and lost a total of $2 billion in just two years, breaking the record in both 1988 and 1989 for the largest losses ever reported by a US airline. Following the loss of Eastern, in June 1990 Texas Air rebranded itself as "Continental Airlines Holdings", in order to "reflect the fact that the principal business of the company is Continental", according to Lorenzo. In August of the same year, Lorenzo agreed to leave the company after selling his remaining shares to SAS. However, the company was never able to recover from its significant debts and poor reputation, and entered bankruptcy in December. In November 1992, Continental and Britt Airways (a commuter airline owned by Texas Air) were bought by an Air Canada-led consortium, resulting in Continental Airlines Holdings being dissolved.

Holdings 

Alongside its official holdings, the company also operated through a number of shell companies in order to protect Texas Air's core assets from bankruptcy proceedings, such as Texas Air Fuel Services, which controlled all fuel transactions for the company's airline subsidiaries.

See also
CASI

References

External links
 

Eastern Air Lines
Airline holding companies of the United States
Holding companies established in 1980
1980 establishments in Texas
American companies established in 1980
Airlines established in 1980